Lucknow Wale Lateefullah is a 2015 Pakistani drama television film directed by Mohammad Iftikhar Iffi, written by Syed Zain Raza, and produced by Inaam Shah. The telefilm stars Hassan Ahmad, Sonya Hussain, Aiman Khan, Ismat Zaidi and Shamim Hilaly in pivotal roles. The telefilm premiered on 10 October 2015 by Hum TV.

Plot
Lateefullah has come from Lucknow to get married in Pakistan. The girl Maira expects him to look like a Bollywood hero. Lateef, on the other hand, expects her to be traditional and conservative. However, both turn out to be completely different from each other's expectations.

Cast
Hassan Ahmed as Lateefullah
Sonya Hussain as Maira Ahmed
Aiman Khan as Aaliya Ahmed
Manzoor Qureshi as Hamid Ahmed (Maira and Aaliya' father)
Ismat Zaidi as Amna Hamid (Maira's mother)
Saleem Mairaj as Inspector
Shamim Hilaly as Zulaiqa (Lateefullah's mother)

Nominations
Nominated for Best Television Film at 4th Hum Awards.

References

External links
 

Pakistani television films
Films set in Lucknow
Films set in Pakistan
2015 films